Yuzhno-Sakhalinsk (literally "South Sakhalin City") is a city on Sakhalin island, and the administrative center of Sakhalin Oblast, Russia. It is located in the Far East part of Russia, situated north of Japan. Gas and oil extraction as well as processing are amongst the main industries on the island. It was called Vladimirovka from 1882 to 1905, then  during its period of Imperial Japanese control from 1905 to 1946. As of the 2010 Census, its population was 181,728.

History
Yuzhno-Sakhalinsk began as a small Russian settlement called Vladimirovka, founded by convicts in 1882. The Treaty of Portsmouth in 1905, which brought an end to the Russo-Japanese War of 1904–1905, awarded the southern half of the Sakhalin Island to Japan. Vladimirovka was renamed Toyohara (meaning "bountiful plain"), and was the prefect capital of the Japanese Karafuto Prefecture.

During the Soviet–Japanese War within World War II, the city was captured by Soviet troops. Ownership of the city was transferred to the Soviet Union and it was renamed Yuzhno-Sakhalinsk. Town status was granted to it in 1946.

Administrative and municipal status
Yuzhno-Sakhalinsk is the administrative center of the oblast. Within the framework of administrative divisions, it is, together with ten rural localities, incorporated as the city of oblast significance of Yuzhno-Sakhalinsk—an administrative unit with the status equal to that of the districts. As a municipal division, the city of oblast significance of Yuzhno-Sakhalinsk is incorporated as Yuzhno-Sakhalinsk Urban Okrug.

Economy and infrastructure
Due to significant investment from oil companies like ExxonMobil and Shell, Yuzhno-Sakhalinsk has experienced substantial economic growth. Although this growth has primarily occurred in the northern part of the island, both companies maintain headquarters and residential complexes in the city of Yuzhno-Sakhalinsk itself. The demand for natural resources by the Japanese, Chinese, and South Koreans has ensured continued prosperity in the foreseeable future for the entire island.

There has been significant criticism, including from Presidential Envoy Kamil Iskhakov, that Sakhalin is not caring for its citizens. Despite sizable gas deposits and incoming investments from gas companies, the regional administration does not yet have plans for the installation of gas services on the island. The oblast also continues to have the highest rate of juvenile crime in all of Russia, and more than 40% of its businesses are unprofitable.

One of the very few remaining Japanese buildings in Yuzhno-Sakhalinsk now functions as the local museum. The building was designed in the Emperor's Crown Style by Japanese architect Yoshio Kaizuka, and completed in 1937.

Transportation
The city hosts the head office of Aurora Airline, subsidiary of Aeroflot. it is  served by the Yuzhno-Sakhalinsk Airport. The city is also the hub for the island's narrow gauge railway network that underwent conversion to Russian broad gauge in August 2019. In addition to railways, the town is also a hub for roadways, such as the A-391 (which travels south to Korsakov) and the A-392 (which travels west to Kholmsk).

Due to restrictions, foreigners wishing to leave Yuzhno-Sakhalinsk in order to travel to any other part of the Sakhalin Oblast and its internal and territorial waters are required to seek permission from the Federal Security Service (FSB) and the Border Guard. Scuba diving and recreating on the seacoast is permitted only in places defined by the Border Guard.

Education
Institutes of elementary and middle education include Sakhalin International School.

Institutes of higher education in the city include Sakhalin State University and Yuzhno-Sakhalinsk Institute of Economics, Law and Informatics. There are also some branches of other universities:
Yuzhno-Sakhalinsk institute (branch) of Russian State trade-economics university
Branch of Far East State university of railways
Branch of Modern Academy of the humanities
Branch of The Pacific State economics university
Branch of Russian economics academy named after G.V. Plekhanov
Branch of Far East law institute

Sport
There exist numerous sport venues and clubs in Sakhalin. FC Sakhalin Yuzhno-Sakhalinsk, PSK Sakhalin, Vostok-65, Sakhalin Sharks, Sakhalin for football, hockey, basketball, youth hockey and volleyball respectively. Mount Bolshevik provides the Gorny Vozdukh ("Mountain Air") ski resort which is qualified for international competitions.

Mass media

Television

3 - 1TV Russia
5 - Rossiya-24 (Russia-24)
10- Rossiya-1 (Russia-1)
12 - ASTV (Alternative Sakhalin Television)
21 - The first multiplex digital TV DVB T2
23 - Che
27 - Domashny / OTV (Sakhalin Regional Television)
30 - NTV Russia 
33 - STS
35 - Ren-TV / Echo of Sakhalin
43 - Match TV Russia (ex. Russia-2)
46 - Petersburg–Channel 5
49 - Rossiya-K (Russia-K)
51 - The second multiplex of digital TV DVB T2

Radio
87,9 Autoradio (plan)
88,3 Retro FM
88,9 Radio Record
89,9 Russian Radio
101,7 Radio Chanson
102,5 Europa Plus
102,9 Humor FM
103,5 Mayak
104,4 Love Radio
105,1 Radio Dacha (plan)
105,5 Radio ASTV
106,0 Radio Rossii
106,5 Dorognoe Radio
107,2 Vesti FM

Demographics

Population 

Most residents are ethnic Russians, but there also exists a sizable population of Korean Russians. Of the 43,000 Sakhalin Koreans, half are estimated to live in Yuzhno-Sakhalinsk, comprising roughly 12% of the city's population. Also smaller numbers of indigenous minorities, such as Ainu, Nivkhs and Oroks can be found.

Religion 
The majority of the population are Russian Orthodox.

Geography and climate
The city is located on the Susuya River. It is the largest city on the island, and the only one with more than 100,000 inhabitants.
		
The climate is humid continental (Köppen Dfb) with mild summers and cold winters. Maritime influences can be seen in that precipitation is much higher than in interior Russia and that summers are distinctly cooler than in Khabarovsk or Irkutsk, while winters are much milder. Summers are frequently foggy, reducing the amount of sunshine. Considering its southerly maritime position winters are very cold, albeit warmer than expected for surrounding inland areas affected by the Siberian High. Snowfall is more frequent than in those areas, due to said maritime influence bringing moisture to the coastline. Yuzhno-Sakhalinsk is relatively sunny compared to Hokkaido locations, but gloomy by the lower latitudes of the Russian Far East's standards.

Twin towns and sister cities

Yuzhno-Sakhalinsk is twinned with:
 Asahikawa, Japan
 Hakodate, Japan
 Wakkanai, Japan
 Yanji, China
 Ansan, South Korea

References

Notes

Sources

External links

Official website of Yuzhno-Sakhalinsk
Yuzhno-Sakhalinsk: City's History in Architecture
Yuzhno-Sakhalinsk Blizzard Photos

 
Russian Far East
1882 establishments in the Russian Empire
Imperial Crown Style architecture